The United States ambassador to Barbados is the official representative of the government of the United States to the government of Barbados. The title of the ambassador is United States Ambassador to Barbados and the Eastern Caribbean and is concurrently the ambassador to Antigua and Barbuda, Dominica, Grenada, St. Kitts and Nevis, St. Lucia, and St. Vincent and the Grenadines, while residing in Bridgetown, Barbados.

List of U.S. ambassadors to Barbados
The following is a list of U.S. ambassadors, or other chiefs of mission, to Barbados. The title given by the United States State Department to this position is currently Ambassador Extraordinary and Plenipotentiary.

See also
Barbados – United States relations
Foreign relations of Barbados
Ambassadors of the United States

References

 
United States Department of State: Background notes on Barbados

External links
 United States Department of State: Chiefs of Mission for Barbados
 United States Department of State: Barbados
 United States Embassy in Bridgetown

de:Liste der Botschafter der Vereinigten Staaten in Barbados
 01
United States
Barbados
Barbados